Alejandro "Alex" Rivas Concepcion is a Spanish kickboxer currently fighting out of Team Jesus Cabello.

As of May 2019, he was ranked the #3 Strawweight in the world by Combat Press.

Biography and career

In 2018 Rivas became renowned when he got an upset decision win over K-1 featherweight title holder Yuta Murakoshi at only 17 years old. He then faced K-1 Super Bantamweight champion Yoshiki Takei in the quarter-final of the 2019 K-1 World Super Bantamweight Tournament and lost by first round TKO.

In August 2019, Rivas signed a two-year contract with the ONE Championship organization. He is scheduled to make his promotional debut against ONE Flyweight Muay Thai World Champion Rodtang Jitmuangnon in a non-title kickboxing match at ONE Championship: Fists Of Fury on February 26, 2021.

Titles

Amateur

 2017 WKPF Intercontinental -57 kg Champion
 
 2015 ISKA Amateur full-contact Europe Champion
 
 2015 ISKA Amateur K-1 rules Spain Champion

Pro Kickboxing record 

|-  style="background:#FFBBBB;"
| 2019-06-30|| Loss ||align=left| Yoshiki Takei || K-1 World GP 2019: Super Bantamweight World Tournament, Quarter Finals|| Tokyo, Japan || TKO (2 knockdowns rule) || 1 ||
|-  style="background:#CCFFCC;"
| 2018-11-03|| Win ||align=left| Yuta Murakoshi || K-1 World GP 2018: 3rd Super Lightweight Championship Tournament || Saitama, Japan || Decision || 3 || 3:00
|- bgcolor="#FFBBBB"
| 2018-06-09 || Loss ||align=left| Thai Barlow  || Enfusion Newcastle || Newcastle, England || Decision (Extra round) || 4 || 3:00
|- bgcolor="#FFBBBB"
| 2018-03-10 || Loss ||align=left| Helder Victor  || Dynamite Fight Night 32 || Albufeira, Portugal || Decision  || 3 || 3:00
|-  style="background:#fbb;"
| 2018-01-27 || Loss ||align=left| Frederico Cordeiro || Brothers League VII || Portugal || Decision|| 3 || 3:00
|- bgcolor="#FFBBBB"
| 2017-05-27 || Loss ||align=left| Manu Gomez || Shocktime Promotions || Spain || Decision || 3 || 3:00
|- bgcolor="#FFBBBB"
| 2017-05-06 || Loss ||align=left| Evan Jays  || Muay Thai Grand Prix  2 || London, England ||  Decision || 3 || 3:00
|-
| colspan=9 | Legend:

See also 
List of male kickboxers

References

2001 births
Living people
Spanish male kickboxers